Hwangbo Hye-jeong (born on 16 August 1980), better known as Hwangbo, is a South Korean singer and rapper. She debuted in 1999 as a rapper in the group Bros, before joining the K-pop girl group Chakra in 2000. After Chakra disbanded in 2006, Hwangbo released the solo album Lady In Black in 2007. She has acted in South Korean dramas including Between Miss and Ma'am (2004) and Could Love Become Money (2012). She was also a cast member on the variety shows We Got Married (2008) and Infinite Girls (2008–2013).

Career

1999: Pre-debut 
While working in a pasta restaurant, Hwangbo was discovered by producer and comedian Lee Sang-min. Before her debut, she was an apprentice to Lee Sang-min while she was part of the band Bros in 1999.

2000–2006: Debut 
In 2000, Hwangbo debuted as part of the female group Chakra. She started as a vocalist and rapper, and later became the leader of the group. Hwangbo went into a period of depression after Chakra dissolved in 2006 due to financial difficulties. She became involved in various volunteer work, especially in Africa and the Middle East. She appeared in few shows such as X-Man and Love Letter. During this time, she cultivated an unfeminine image, due to her strong gestures of frankness and simplicity. This led her to be nicknamed "general" in the Korean entertainment scene.

2007–2010: Solo career 
Three years after Chakra's fourth studio album, her solo debut album, titled Lady in Black, was released in March 2007. The success of "Sorry For The Tears" marked a change in her public image. The solo debut album consisted of thirteen songs that demonstrated her talent and skill in singing.

In May 2008, Hwangbo joined the Munhwa Broadcasting Corporation (MBC) reality show We Got Married, where she was paired with SS501 leader Kim Hyun Joong. They received the MBC Entertainment Award for best couple on 28 December 2008. On 14 December, Joong and Hwangbo departed from the show due to programming conflicts. At the same time, her popularity as a singer continued to rise in Asia. She released the digital single Gift for Him the same year. Her song "Get Hot" ("뜨거워 져") took her stardom to Europe, becoming the first Korean to achieve it. The dance became very popular among the Korean public that led to the popular fashion dance, Tecktonik (known as the Tecktonik wave). The remix and the dance was presented by Koo Junyup. Also on Gift for Him was her hit "Mature".

On 18 August 2009, she released an extended play mini-album EP, titled R2song, in South Korea, which included her previous hits. The track "R2song" was released on 7 August 2009 for the first time in the United Kingdom, ranking  1 on the main European charts. This was the first time that an Asian singer achieved this position in Europe, which was considered a feat by the Asian media. Eventually, three other versions of "R2song", mixed by the producer Postino, were released. The main single was successful in Korea, ranking No. 1 on the "Mnet" account and No. 11 on the "K-Chart" singles list, in addition to entering the top 20 and top 10 on several popularity charts. It was also cataloged by the best DJs in Europe as the No. 1 dance theme. After all this adulation and popularity, Hwangbo was called a "sexy superstar".

She hosted several television programs such as Nodaji, Finding Delicious, and Human Mentor. In 2008 and 2009, she was a member of the first season of Infinity Girls, a female version of Infinite Challenge, broadcast by MBC Every 1. In 2010, she was one of the five MCs of Midnight Idols along with Kim Hyung Jun of SS501, Kim Chang Ryul, Eun Ji-won, and Kim Sung-soo of Cool.

A year after the release of "R2song", the digital single "I'm Still Beautiful" was released in late October 2010. The song topped several popularity charts in Canada.

2011–2013: Acting 
In 2011, Hwangbo appeared in the Seoul Broadcasting System comedy Oh My God, playing the role of a charismatic wife, demonstrating extraordinary charm and attracting a vast audience. In November, she participated in the musical Nun Feeling, which lasted about three months and was praised for strong singing power. In 2012, she participated in the Maeil Broadcasting Network drama Can Love become Money, playing a leading role and getting a good evaluation. Hwangbo participated in the third season of Infinity Girls, after which she moved away from the entertainment industry.

2014–2016: Entrepreneur 
On 21 March 2014, she established the personal clothing store BO! GO!  and a private "muah puntual" coffee shop was opened in the Mapo area in Seoul.

2016–present: Return 
Hwangbo returned to the entertainment industry after a sabbatical of 3 years. She continues working as a model, participating at the Seoul Fashion Week. Since 2017, she has appeared as a recurring guest on various shows such as the Knowing Bros. In August 2018, she paired up with Nam Bo-ra in Secret Unnies.

Charity work 
Hwangbo is part of "Compassion", a charity group, since 2007. She actively helps people seeking refuge in Seoul, and directs money to the Revival Project.

Personal life 
Hwangbo actively participates in community activities. On 5 February 2011, Hwangbo entered the restaurant business with her trusted friend and colleague, Shim Tae Yoon. She is currently the co-owner of the branch, Shimsontang, in the Mapo district, situated in the northwest of Seoul, South Korea. In 2014, she launched BO! GO!, an online fashion clothing store, a coffee shop and pub.

In 2016, she started a relationship with a Hong Kong resident.

Discography

Studio albums

Singles

Filmography

Films

Television dramas

Television variety shows

Web series

Stage musicals

Radio shows

Awards

References

External links

1980 births
Living people
K-pop singers
South Korean female idols
South Korean women pop singers
Yeongcheon Hwangbo clan
21st-century South Korean singers
21st-century South Korean women singers